Eois obliviosa is a moth in the family Geometridae. It is found on Borneo. The habitat consists of lowland forests and lower montane forests.

The length of the forewings is 10–11 mm.

References

Moths described in 1997
Eois
Moths of Asia